The Chief is a 1933 American pre-Code comedy film directed by Charles Reisner and written by Arthur Caesar and Robert E. Hopkins. The film stars Ed Wynn, Charles "Chic" Sale, Dorothy Mackaill, William "Stage" Boyd, Effie Ellsler and C. Henry Gordon. The film was released on November 3, 1933, by Metro-Goldwyn-Mayer.

Cast
Ed Wynn as Henry Summers
Charles "Chic" Sale as Uncle Joe
Dorothy Mackaill as Dixie Dean
William "Stage" Boyd as Dan 'Danny' O'Rourke 
Effie Ellsler as Ma Summers
C. Henry Gordon as Paul Clayton
Mickey Rooney as Willie
Purnell Pratt as Al Morgan 
George Givot as Greek Clothing Merchant
Tom Wilson as Blink
Nat Pendleton as Big Mike

Reception
The film was a box office disappointment for MGM.

References

External links 
 

1933 films
1933 comedy films
American comedy films
American black-and-white films
Films directed by Charles Reisner
Metro-Goldwyn-Mayer films
1930s English-language films
1930s American films